Kilgore is a city in Gregg and Rusk counties in the eastern part of the U.S. state of Texas. Over three-fourths of the city limits is located in Gregg County, the remainder in Rusk County. The population was 12,975 at the 2010 census and 13,376 at the 2020 census.

From the age of six, Van Cliburn lived in Kilgore; he became an internationally known classical pianist. He is the namesake for Van Cliburn Auditorium on the Kilgore College campus.

History
Kilgore was founded in 1872 when the International–Great Northern Railroad completed the initial phase of rail line between Palestine and Longview. That way the railroad gained the profits from sale and development of these lands.

The new town received a post office in 1873 and, with a station and transportation for getting commodity crops to market, soon began to draw residents and businesses away from New Danville. By 1885, the population had reached 250, and the community had two cotton gins, a church, and a school (for white children only). The racially segregated Kilgore Independent School District was organized in 1910. By 1914 the town had two banks, several businesses, and a reported population of 700. The 1920s showed continued steady growth, and by 1929 Kilgore was home to an estimated 1,000 residents.

Prosperity came to a halt, however, when Kilgore was dealt severe blows by a steep decline in cotton prices (on which most of the town's economy was still based), and the effects of the Great Depression. Businesses began to close and, by the middle of 1930, the population had fallen to 500; the community appeared destined to become a ghost town. Many Blacks joined the Great Migration out of the South to northern, midwestern, and western cities for work.

Kilgore's fortunes changed dramatically on October 3, 1930, when wildcatter Columbus M. "Dad" Joiner struck oil near the neighboring town of Henderson. This well, known as the Daisy Bradford #3, marked the discovery of the vast East Texas Oil Field. Seemingly overnight Kilgore was transformed from a small farming town on the decline into a bustling boomtown. The Daisy Bradford #3 was subsequently followed by the Lou Della Crim No. 1 and many others.  By 1936, the population had increased to more than 12,000, and Kilgore's skyline was crowded with oil derricks.

Oil production continued at a breakneck pace throughout the early 1930s, with more than 1,100 producing oil wells within city limits at the height of the boom. The explosive growth left most civic services overwhelmed, and as a result Kilgore was forced to incorporate in 1931. With the city flooded with male workers and roustabouts, law enforcement struggled to keep order among the shanties, tents, and ramshackle honky-tonks that crowded Kilgore's main streets. On one occasion, they had to summon help from the Texas Rangers to keep the peace.

By the mid-1930s the oil boom had begun to subside, and most of the small oil companies and wildcatters had sold out to major corporations. The boom was essentially over by 1940. But oil production has remained central to the city's economy. The population, which fluctuated wildly throughout the 1930s, stabilized at around 10,000 in the 1950s. A 2015 estimate placed it at just under 15,000 residents.

Geography

Kilgore is located in southern Gregg County at  (32.385534, –94.868502), and extends south into Rusk County. U.S. Route 259 passes through the east side of the city as a limited-access bypass, leading northeast  to Longview and south  to Henderson. I-20 leads east  to Shreveport, Louisiana, and west  to Dallas.

Major highways

  Interstate 20
  Highway 259
  State Highway 31
  State Highway 42
  Texas State Highway 135

Demographics

As of the 2020 United States census, there were 13,376 people, 5,060 households, and 3,476 families residing in the city.

As of the census of 2000, 11,301 people, 4,403 households, and 2,963 families resided in the city. The population density was 734.3 people per square mile (283.5/km). The 4,766 housing units averaged 309.7 per square mile (119.6/km). The racial makeup of the city was 78.22% White, 12.34% African American, 0.41% Native American, 0.68% Asian, 0.03% Pacific Islander, 6.95% from other races, and 1.38% from two or more races. Hispanics or Latinos of any race were 11.11% of the population.

Of the 4,403 households, 30.2% had children under the age of 18 living with them, 50.5% were married couples living together, 12.6% had a female householder with no husband present, and 32.7% were not families. About 27.6% of all households were made up of individuals, and 13.6% had someone living alone who was 65 years of age or older. The average household size was 2.48 and the average family size was 3.03.

In the city, the population was distributed as 24.6% under the age of 18, 12.5% from 18 to 24, 26.2% from 25 to 44, 20.3% from 45 to 64, and 16.5% who were 65 years of age or older. The median age was 36 years. For every 100 females, there were 94.3 males. For every 100 females age 18 and over, there were 91.1 males.

The median income for a household in the city was $43,129, and for a family was $61,765. Males had a median income of $45,995 versus $30,124 for females. The per capita income for the city was $21,297. About 9.7% of families and 15.1% of the population were below the poverty line, including 19.1% of those under age 18 and 13.9% of those age 65 or over.

Arts and culture

Kilgore is the home of the Mount Tabor Indian Community, a cultural heritage organization and nonprofit organization.

Texas Shakespeare Festival
Kilgore is home to the Texas Shakespeare Festival, an annual summer repertory company. Founded in 1986, the Texas Shakespeare Festival presents four shows in rotating repertory every summer at the Van Cliburn Auditorium on the campus of Kilgore College.

Kilgore Public Library
Based on the style of Normandy cottages, construction of the Kilgore Public Library began in 1933 and was completed in 1939. The New Deal agencies, the Public Works Administration and Works Progress Administration of the President Franklin D. Roosevelt administration, participated in the construction.

East Texas Pipe Organ Festival

Every November, Kilgore hosts the East Texas Pipe Organ Festival, which honors the work of pipe organ voicer Roy Perry (1906–1978). Perry, a longtime resident of Kilgore, worked for the Aeolian-Skinner Organ Company, and he oversaw the construction of highly regarded pipe organs at St. Mark's Cathedral (Shreveport, Louisiana) and Washington National Cathedral.

Kilgore Film Festival
The Kilgore Film Festival began in 1998 under the sponsorship of KTPB, the former public radio station of Kilgore College. Each year a festival is held in the Spring and Fall offering moviegoers a chance to see unique and award-winning selections. The festival is held at Kilgore's 4 Star Cinema.

Government

Local government
According to the city's most recent Comprehensive Annual Financial Report Fund Financial Statements, the city's various funds had $17.4 million in revenues, $19.4 million in expenditures, $19.5 million in total assets, $0.8 million in total liabilities, and $17.5 million in investments.

The structure of the management and coordination of city services is:

State government
Kilgore is represented in the Texas Senate by Republican Bryan Hughes, District 1, and in the Texas House of Representatives by Republican David Simpson, District 7 and Travis Clardy, District 11.

Federal government
At the federal level, the two U.S. senators from Texas are Republicans John Cornyn and Ted Cruz. Kilgore is part of Texas's 1st congressional district, which is currently represented by Republican Nathaniel Moran.

Education

Public schools
The city is served by the Kilgore Independent School District.  A small portion of the town is also served by the Sabine ISD.

Colleges and universities
Kilgore College is home to the Rangers and the Kilgore College Rangerettes.

Media
The Kilgore News Herald is a twice-weekly newspaper published in the city.

Notable events

On September 23, 1983, five men and women were abducted from a Kentucky Fried Chicken restaurant in Kilgore and found slain, execution-style, in an oilfield outside of town. The crime went unsolved until November 2005, when two men, already in prison for other crimes, were charged, tried and convicted for this crime.

In 2001, the Kilgore College Ranger football team had a perfect season, winning the Southwest Junior College Football Conference. The 2001 squad finished #2 in the nation, losing the NJCAA national championship when the coaches poll gave the championship to Georgia Military College.

On December 18, 2004, the Kilgore High School "Ragin' Red" Bulldog football team completed a perfect season (16–0) after winning the Class 4A Division II state championship game, 33–27, in a double-overtime thriller against the Dallas Lincoln Tigers at Baylor University's Floyd Casey Stadium in Waco. Nick Sanders blocked a potential go-ahead field goal attempt by Lincoln and returned it for the winning touchdown.

In popular culture
 Folk singer-songwriter Woody Guthrie refers to Kilgore and Longview, Texas, in his song "East Texas Red".
In the 2011 film Country Strong, actor Garrett Hedlund makes the quote, "Ms. Dallas or Ms. Kilgore? What's the difference?" to co-star Leighton Meester.
Michael Herr's Vietnam War memoir Dispatches features an unnamed helicopter door-gunner from Kilgore.  The man's attitude and appearance partially inspired the character of Lt. Colonel William Kilgore in Francis Ford Coppola's Apocalypse Now and the door gunner's dialogue in Stanley Kubrick's later Vietnam film Full Metal Jacket.  Herr contributed to the screenplays of both films.
 Actor Matt Damon mentions Kilgore when impersonating his friend Matthew McConaughey on the Late Show with David Letterman.

Notable people

 Van Cliburn, noted piano virtuoso, lived and grew up in Kilgore from age 6 through age 17. His family's modest home was in the 700 block of South Martin Street.
 Dana Dodd (1985–2003), murder victim; body found in Kilgore in 2006.
 Charles Hurwitz (born 1940), businessman and financier, he is known for his role in the savings and loan crisis and controversy around the Headwater Forest lumber logging in the 1990s; he was born and raised in Kilgore.
Ron Shepherd (born 1960), former outfielder for the Toronto Blue Jays; attended Kilgore High School.
David Van Os (born 1950), Civil Rights, Labor Lawyer, Politician; attended Kilgore High School.

Gallery

References

External links

 
 City of Kilgore official website
 Texas State Historical Association

Cities in Texas
Cities in Gregg County, Texas
Cities in Rusk County, Texas
Longview metropolitan area, Texas